Bucculatrix subnitens is a moth in the family Bucculatricidae. It is found in North America, where it has been recorded from Arizona. The species was described by Thomas de Grey, 6th Baron Walsingham in 1914.

References

Natural History Museum Lepidoptera generic names catalog

Bucculatricidae
Moths described in 1914
Taxa named by Thomas de Grey, 6th Baron Walsingham
Moths of North America